Lee Grenon (born 1963 or 1964) is a Canadian retired Paralympic swimmer. He competed at the 1980, 1984, and 1988 Paralympics. He is from North Vancouver, British Columbia.

References

Living people
1960s births
Paralympic swimmers of Canada
Medalists at the 1988 Summer Paralympics
Paralympic gold medalists for Canada
Paralympic silver medalists for Canada
Paralympic bronze medalists for Canada
Paralympic medalists in swimming
Swimmers at the 1980 Summer Paralympics
Swimmers at the 1984 Summer Paralympics
Swimmers at the 1988 Summer Paralympics
Canadian male freestyle swimmers
Canadian male medley swimmers
Canadian male butterfly swimmers
20th-century Canadian people